Kitimat Airport  is located  north of Kitimat, British Columbia, Canada.

See also
Terrace–Kitimat Airport

References

Registered aerodromes in British Columbia
Regional District of Kitimat–Stikine